The Ministry of Entrepreneurship and Crafts of the Republic of Croatia was a  ministry in the Government of Croatia which is in charge of the administrative and other tasks related to small and medium enterprises, crafts, cooperatives, promotion of exports and foreign investment and improving competitiveness. In the Cabinet of Andrej Plenković in 2016 it was merged with the Ministry of Economy into the Ministry of Economy, Small and Medium Entrepreneurship and Crafts.

List of ministers

Ministers of Crafts, Small and Mid-sized Entrepreneurship (2000-2003)

Ministers of Entrepreneurship and Crafts (2011-2016)

References

External links 
 

Entrepreneurship and Crafts
Ministries established in 2011
2011 establishments in Croatia